Çaytepe is a village in the Genç District, Bingöl Province, Turkey. The village is populated by Kurds of the Ziktî tribe and had a population of 609 in 2021.

The hamlets of Derezel, Dikistasyonu, Düşmalan and Kırnik are attached to the village.

References 

Villages in Genç District
Kurdish settlements in Bingöl Province